Turniptown Mountain is a summit in the U.S. state of Georgia.

Turniptown Mountain took its name from a nearby indigenous settlement where tubers were harvested, an important food source to Native Americans.

References

Mountains of Gilmer County, Georgia
Mountains of Georgia (U.S. state)